Alibi is a 1969 Italian comedy film directed by Adolfo Celi and starring Vittorio Gassman.

Cast
 Vittorio Gassman - Vittorio
 Adolfo Celi - Adolfo
  - Luciano
 Tina Aumont - Filli
 Franco Giacobini - Luca
 Jovanna Knox - La contessa
 Ines Kummernus - Moglie di Adolfo
 Grande Otelo - Tranviere
 Marcia Rodriguez - Gracia
 Lina Sadun - Madre di Vittorio
 Vincenzo Sartini - Enrico
 Silvana Venturelli - Paola
 Alberto Moravia - himself

References

External links

1969 films
1960s Italian-language films
1969 comedy films
Films directed by Adolfo Celi
Films directed by Vittorio Gassman
Films scored by Ennio Morricone
Italian comedy films
1960s Italian films